Arthur Gabriel Hebert  (1886–1963) was an English monk of Kelham, Nottinghamshire (more strictly a member of the Society of the Sacred Mission), and a proponent within Anglicanism of the ideas of the Liturgical Movement. As such he was in familiar contact with Benedictine monasteries in Austria and Germany. Hebert also had contacts with artists and with Protestant circles in Switzerland and with the high church Lutheran movement in Sweden. He was very much aware of the social implications of liturgical renewal in Continental Europe.

Hebert was in some respects a disciple of Gregory Dix.

Early life
Hebert was born on 28 May 1886 in Silloth, Cumberland, the son of the priest Septimus Hebert and his wife Caroline Charlotte Haslam. He was educated at Harrow School. He graduated from New College, Oxford, with first-class honours in literae humaniores in 1908 and with first-class honours in theology in 1909. Following his ordination to the diaconate in 1911, Hebert was priested in 1912.

Works

Christus Victor, 1931 by Gustaf Aulen (translator)
Liturgy and Society, London: Faber and Faber, 1935
The Parish Eucharist, 1936
The Form of the Church, 1945
contributor to Catholicity: a study in the conflict of Christian traditions in the west / being a report presented to...the Archbishop of Canterbury, Westminster: Dacre Press, 1947
The Authority of the Old Testament, London: Faber and Faber, 1947
Fundamentalism and the Church of God, Philadelphia: Westminster, 1957
The Christ of Faith and the Jesus of History, London: SCM Press, 1962
The Old Testament from Within, London: Oxford, 1962
Apostle and Bishop: a study of the Gospel, the ministry, and the Church-community, London: Faber and Faber, 1963
contributor to True Worship, ed. Lancelot Sheppard, Baltimore : London: Helicon Press; Darton, Longman & Todd, 1963 
Articles in The Expository Times

See also
 Parish Communion movement

Notes

References

Footnotes

Bibliography

External links
 Bibliographic directory from Project Canterbury

1886 births
1963 deaths
20th-century Anglican theologians
20th-century Church of England clergy
20th-century English Anglican priests
20th-century English translators
Alumni of New College, Oxford
Anglican liturgists
Anglican monks
Anglo-Catholic clergy
Anglo-Catholic theologians
Church of England priests
English Anglican theologians
English Anglo-Catholics
English Christian monks
People educated at Harrow School
People from Newark and Sherwood (district)
Swedish–English translators